Mixer is the second album by American indie rock band Desario, released in February 2012 on Test Pattern Records.

Track listing
 "Cement Sneakers"
 "Call Out Your Rivals"
 "Occasional Monsters"
 "Develop Destroy"
 "Ana Carlisle"
 "Victoria Island"
 "These Machines"
 "Success (Is Ours)"
 "Airline"
 "June"

Reviews 
Mixer was picked by The Big Takeover as one of Jack Rabid's Best of 2012. But SoundXP's review was mixed, writing that "(another) band mixing The Jesus & Mary Chain, Pavement and Teenage Fanclub may not be what the world's been crying out for, but when it works well - as on 'Call Out Your Rivals' or 'Success (Is Ours)' - it's a treat to listen to."

References

External links
 Mixer on AllMusic

2012 albums
Desario albums